Marijke Elizabeth Mars (born 1965) is an American billionaire heiress and businesswoman. In March 2018 Forbes estimated her wealth to be $5.9 billion. She was ranked as the 30th-richest woman in the world, a position shared with her three sisters.

Marijke Mars is a fourth generation member of the Mars family. Her father was the late Forrest Mars Jr. (1931–2016). She has three sisters: Pamela Mars-Wright, Valerie Mars and Victoria B. Mars. She inherited about an 8 percent stake of Mars Inc. in 2016, which made her a billionaire. According to Forbes, her shares were valued at $5.9 billion (March 2018).

She graduated (B.A./B.Sc.) from Duke University. After her graduation she has worked as a regional manager for Kal Kan Foods, one of Mars Inc.'s pet food companies. Nowadays she works at Mars Food. She married Stephen J. Doyle in 1991, but later (2000) divorced.

References

Living people
1965 births
Duke University alumni
Mars family
American billionaires
Female billionaires